Commandant Ferradj Airport is an airport in Tindouf, Algeria .

Airlines and destinations

Statistics

References

 OurAirports - Tindouf

Airports in Algeria
Buildings and structures in Tindouf Province